Hansel Giovanny Atencia Suarez (born 24 May 1997) is a Colombian-Spanish basketball player for Oviedo CB of the Spanish LEB Oro. He is a member of the Colombia national basketball team.

Playing career

College career
Atencia averaged a team-leading 17.5 points and 5.3 assists during his senior season and was named to the NAIA All-American Second Team.

Professional career
After graduating from college, Atencia signed with Úrvalsdeild karla club Þór Akureyri in June 2019. He appeared in 21 games for Þór in the Úrvalsdeild before the final game and the playoffs where canceled due to the coronavirus pandemic in Iceland, averaging 18.2 points and 5.6 assists.

The following season, Atencia stayed in the Úrvalsdeild, signing with Haukar. In November 2020, it was announced that Haukar had loaned Atencia to Titanes de Barranquilla due to the Covid-19 stoppage in the Úrvalsdeild. He was expected to finish the Colombian leagues season with Titanes and return to Iceland in December. On 22 November 2020, he helped Titanes win the Liga de Baloncesto Profesional championship. On 25 April 2021, Atencia made a running three point shot from just inside the half court line at the buzzer to help Haukar beat KR 72–69.

Following the Úrvalsdeild season, Atencia returned to Titanes and helped them win their fourth consecutive LBP title on 7 June 2021. On 3 February 2022, he signed with Oviedo CB of the LEB Oro.

References

External links
Profile at Eurobasket.com
Icelandic statistics at Icelandic Basketball Association
Profile at Proballers.com
The Master's Mustangs bio

1997 births
Living people
Liberty Flames basketball players
Colombian men's basketball players
Haukar men's basketball players
Úrvalsdeild karla (basketball) players
Þór Akureyri men's basketball players
Central American and Caribbean Games silver medalists for Colombia
Central American and Caribbean Games medalists in basketball
Competitors at the 2018 Central American and Caribbean Games
Titanes de Barranquilla players
Sportspeople from Santander Department